Ballad of Seodong is a South Korean television series starring Jo Hyun-jae, Lee Bo-young, and Ryu Jin. It aired on SBS from September 5, 2005 to March 21, 2006 on Mondays and Tuesdays at 21:55 for 55 episodes.

The period drama is based on Seodong-yo, said to be one of Korea's oldest folk songs and its first hyangga. According to the Samguk Yusa ("Memorabilia of the Three Kingdoms") from the Silla Kingdom, the song was written by Seodong, a commoner from the Baekje Kingdom. Hearing that Princess Seonhwa, daughter of King Jinpyeong of Silla, was beautiful, he writes a song saying that the princess visits Seodong's room every night, and it quickly spreads throughout the kingdom and beyond, until it reaches the palace in Silla. When her father hears the song, he condemns the innocent princess to exile. Seodong finds Seonhwa, marries her and takes her to Baekje, and they become the royal rulers of the country.

Plot
Seodong is just a commoner, a technician who grew up in Baekje's prestigious science and technology institute Taehaksa, but his life is on the brink of extraordinary change. He meets and falls for Princess Seonhwa of the rival kingdom Silla, and his love for her transcends social position. Seodong also carries a secret that could alter the fate of the Baekje kingdom, but his rival Sataek Giru plots with Buyeo Seon to disrupt his plans.

Cast

Main:
Jo Hyun-jae as Seodong (Wideok's youngest son, later King Mu of Baekje)
Kim Seok as young Seodong
Lee Bo-young as Princess Seonhwa of Silla (Jinpyeong's daughter)
Sulli as young Princess Seonhwa
Ryu Jin as Sataek Giru / Kim Do-ham
Kim Young-ho as Buyeo Seon (Buyeo Gye's son, later King Beop of Baekje)
Lee Chang-hoon as Mok Ra-soo
Jung Sun-kyung as Mo-jin
Supporting:
Lee Il-hwa as Yeon Ga-mo (Seodong's mother)
Jung Wook as King Wideok of Baekje
Jung Jae-gon as Prince Ah-jwa of Baekje (Wideok's oldest son)
Park Tae-ho as Buyeo Gye (Wideok's younger brother, later King Hye of Baekje)
Heo Young-ran as Princess Wooyoung of Baekje (Buyeo Gye's daughter, Buyeo Seon's younger half-sister)
Han In-soo as Hae Do-joo
Lee Byung-sik as Jin-ryeo
Maeng Sang-hoon as Wang Gu
Na Jae-woong as Ahtaek Geolchwi
Son Joon-hyung as Baek Mu
Im Hyun-sik as Maek Do-soo
Baek Bong-ki as Beom-ro (Maek Do-soo's youngest son)
Oh Seung-yoon as Beom-saeng (Maek Do-soo's oldest son)
Koo Hye-sun as Eun-jin (Mo-jin's daughter)
Lee Sook as Kook-soo
Lee Seung-ah as Woo-soo
Shin Gook as Ko Mo
Song Young-yong as Ah So-ji
Kim Yoo-jin as Joo Ri-young
Byun Il-tae as Koyi Soji
Choi Dong-joon as King Jinpyeong of Silla (Seonhwa's father)
Kim Hwa-ran as Queen Maya of Silla (Seonhwa's mother)
Lee Kyung-hwa as Princess Cheonmyeong of Silla (Seonhwa's older sister, Jinpyeong's daughter)
Na Sung-kyoon as Kim Sa-heum (Kim Do-ham's father)
Kim Jin-ho as Wi Song
Ahn Yeo-jin as Bo-myung
Noh Yoon as Cho-ki
Seo Beom-shik as Seo-chung
Sung Chang-hoon as Koo-san
Lee Hee-do as Heuk Chi-pyeong
Ha Sung-chul as soldier
Kim Se-min as Jang-doo
Ryu Sung-hoon as warrior
Lee Hwan as butler
Bang Kil-seung as Yak-san
Yuny Han as Buyeo Seon's wife
Han Bo-bae
Jin Tae-hyun as Yoo-rim
Kwon Yong-woon
Park Kyung-hwan
Kwon Hyuk
Joo Min-soo
Yoo Hyun-ji as young princess
Seol Ji-yoon as technician So-young

Ratings
In the tables below, the   represent the lowest ratings and the  represent the highest ratings.

References

External links
Ballad of Seo Dong official website 

2005 South Korean television series debuts
2006 South Korean television series endings
Seoul Broadcasting System television dramas
Television series set in Baekje
Television series set in Silla
South Korean historical television series
Television shows written by Kim Young-hyun
Television series by Kim Jong-hak Production